The National Library of Northern Cyprus is the National Library of the Turkish Republic of Northern Cyprus, located in Nicosia. It was founded on November 17, 1958. The collection consists of 229.626 books.

References

External links
 Milli Kütüphane (National Library of Northern Cyprus)

Cyprus, Northern
Libraries in Northern Cyprus
Libraries established in 1958
Buildings and structures in North Nicosia